Luo Changpei (9 August 1899 – 13 December 1958) was a Chinese linguist. He made important contributions to the study of historical Chinese phonology. He was also a pioneer of the modern studies of Chinese dialects and of non-Chinese languages in China.

Born into a Manchu family, he graduated from the Peking University. Besides spending some years in the United States as  a visiting scholar, he spent most of his academic life at Peking University. Among his students there were the British scholars Michael Halliday and David Hawkes. In 1929, along with Y.R. Chao and Li Fang-kuei, he became a researcher at the Institute of History and Philology (歷史語言研究所) of Academia Sinica (then located at Nanjing). He also served as director of the Institute of Linguistics at the Chinese Academy of Sciences until his death in 1958.

Luo also co-authored a book on the 'Phags-pa script with Cai Meibiao.

Bibliography 

With Zhou Zumo
1958. Han Wei Jin Nanbeichao yunbu yanbian yanjiu 漢魏晉南北朝頸部演變研究. Peking. 科學出版社

With Cai Meibiao
1959. Basibazi yu Yuandai Hanyu [Ziliao Huibian] 八思巴字與元代漢語[資料彙編]. Beijing : Kexue Chubanshe. Revised edition, 2004.

References
 Biographical sketch (Chinese Academy of Social Sciences)
 A memoir of Luo Changpei (悼念羅常培先生) by Lao She

Linguists from China
Chinese sinologists
'Phags-pa script scholars
Manchu people
National University of Peking alumni
Academic staff of Peking University
1899 births
1958 deaths
Educators from Beijing
Academic staff of the Northwest University (China)
Academic staff of Xiamen University
Academic staff of Sun Yat-sen University
Writers from Beijing
Members of the Chinese Academy of Sciences
Academic staff of the National Southwestern Associated University
20th-century linguists